O2 Arena (formerly Sazka Arena, stylised as O2 arena) is a multi-purpose arena, in Prague, Czech Republic. It is home to HC Sparta Prague of the Czech Extraliga and is the second-largest ice hockey arena in Europe.

It has hosted important sporting events such as two Ice Hockey World Championships (2004 and 2015), the first edition of the prestigious tennis Laver Cup, the European Athletics Indoor Championships, the Euroleague Final Four 2006, the World Floorball Championship, the Davis Cup finals, as well as a handful of NHL and KHL games, including a 2014 Gagarin Cup final. It can also host stage shows, such as concerts, and other large-scale events.

History

The idea of building a new arena in Prague came on the heels of the "golden era" of Czech ice hockey: winning the gold medal at the 1998 Winter Olympics and three gold medals in a row at the Ice Hockey World Championships. The arena was proposed to be built in time to host the 2003 Men's World Ice Hockey Championships, but due to unforeseen complications with the investors, the ice hockey governing body had to switch that tournament to Finland. The arena's main backer then became Sazka a.s., a Czech betting company.

The construction of the arena (which began in September 2002) was not without problems, but it was finally finished in time to host the 2004 Men's World Ice Hockey Championships.

In March 2008, the building was renamed O2 Arena.

In March 2011, Sazka filed for insolvency due to debts from building the arena.

From its opening until 2015, it was home to HC Slavia Prague of the Czech Extraliga. Slavia won the national championship on home ice in Game 7 of the 2008 Extraliga finals against HC Karlovy Vary 4–0 in front of a then-league-record crowd of 17,117. In 2015, Slavia was relegated to the 1.liga, and the club chose to move back to the smaller Zimní stadion Eden, the team's former home and current training centre. In its place, O2 Arena reached an agreement with cross-town rivals Sparta Prague on 24 June 2015. Sparta ownership cited the need for significant renovations at Tipsport Arena as the main reason for the move.

For two seasons, 2012–13 and 2013–14, O2 Arena also hosted occasional home games of HC Lev Prague of the Kontinental Hockey League. The club played its home games of the 2014 Gagarin Cup Finals at O2 Arena, attracting the three largest crowds in league history.

In 2015, O2 Arena co-hosted the IIHF World Championship with ČEZ Aréna in Ostrava for the second time. This time, the tournament re-established the record for World Championship attendance.

In 2017, it hosted the 1st edition of Laver Cup international indoor hard court men's tennis tournament between Europe and Team World.

In 2021, the venue was scheduled to host some group phase matches at the FIBA EuroBasket 2021, which the country was to cohost with Georgia in Tbilisi, Germany in Berlin/Cologne and Italy in Milan. The event was canceled.

Notable events
 On 6 & 7 September 2006 Madonna performed there during her Confessions Tour. The concert was attended by 18,628 spectators, the biggest number of spectators in the arena's history. She performed again at the arena on 7 & 8 November 2015 as part of her Rebel Heart Tour selling out crowds of over 16,000 patrons.
 On 12 May 2008, Kylie Minogue performed there as part of her KylieX2008. She performed again at the arena on 2 March 2011 as part of her Aphrodite World Tour. On 21 October 2014 Minogue performed again as part of her Kiss Me Once Tour.
 On 26 June 2008 Céline Dion performed there during Taking Chances World Tour.
 In October 2008, the New York Rangers and Tampa Bay Lightning opened the 2008–09 NHL season at O2 Arena with two games. Two years later, the NHL returned, with the Boston Bruins and Phoenix Coyotes playing twice.
 In November 2008, the French electronica pioneer Jean Michel Jarre performed his Oxygène album live at the arena, as part of the second leg of the Oxygène 30th anniversary tour.
 In December 2008, the arena played host to the playoff matches of the 2008 Men's World Floorball Championships, including Finland's 7–6 victory over Sweden in the final.
 In April 2009, Tina Turner performed concert as part of European leg of the Tina!: 50th Anniversary Tour
Sting performed during his Symphonicities Tour on 22 September 2010, along with the Royal Philharmonic Orchestra.
 In November 2010, Lady Gaga performed there during her Monster Ball Tour.On 7 December 2011, Rihanna performed there during her Loud Tour.
 The Czech Republic Davis Cup Team defeated Spain in the 2012 Davis Cup Final.
 On 26 October 2012, Jennifer Lopez performed a sold-out show during her Dance Again World Tour.
 On 22 November 2012, Muse performed there during their The 2nd Law World Tour.
 On 5 October 2014, Lady Gaga performed there as part of Artrave: The Artpop Ball tour.
 On 9 November 2014, the Czech Fed Cup team defeated the German Fed Cup team in the final of the 2014 Fed Cup.
 On 17 February 2015, Queen + Adam Lambert performed there as part of their Queen + Adam Lambert Tour 2014-2015. The group returned to the arena on November 1, 2017, to kick off their 2017 European tour.
 On 23 February 2015, Katy Perry performed there as part of Prismatic World Tour.
 On January 30, 2016, Ellie Goulding performed there as part of Delirium World Tour.
 On November 12, 2016, Justin Bieber performed a sold-out show during his Purpose World Tour.
 On July 27, 2016, Rihanna performed there as part of ANTI World Tour.
 Gorillaz performed at the arena on 14 November 2017, as part of their Humanz Tour.
 On 2 April 2018, Metallica performed there as part of WorldWired Tour.
 On 16 April 2018 Imagine Dragons performed here as a part of their Evolve World Tour.
 On 7 & 8 May 2018, Enrique Iglesias performed there as part of Enrique Iglesias Live.
 On 1 July 2018 Pearl Jam performed there as part of Pearl Jam 2018 Tour.
 On 10 October 2018, Shania Twain performed there as part of Shania Now Tour.
 On 7 May 2019, Elton John performed there as part of Farewell Yellow Brick Road
 On 4 September 2019, Ariana Grande performed there as part of Sweetener World Tour.
 On 16 February 2020, Twenty One Pilots performed there as part of The Bandito Tour.
 On 29 May 2020, Eric Clapton will start his Summer European Tour 2020 at the arena.

 On 20 December 2021 the mother of Symphonic Metal Nightwish will perform here as part of their long-awaited and postponed "Human:Nature European Tour 2020/21"
 On 29 April 2022, 5 Seconds of Summer will perform here as part of their No Shane Tour.
 On 11 June 2022, My Chemical Romance will perform here as part as their My Chemical Romance Reunion Tour.
 On 15 July 2022, Harry Styles will perform here as a part of his Love on Tour.
 On 12 March 2023, Justin Bieber will perform here as a part of his Justice World Tour.
 On 30 & 31 May 2023, Iron Maiden are scheduled to perform here as a part of their The Future Past Tour.
 The arena is also the home of Transmission (festival) since 2007.
 On 6 March 2024, Céline Dion will return to the arena as part of her Courage World Tour.

Technical facts

Number of floors: 6
Floor space: 35,000 m2
Capacity: up to 18,000 spectators (depends on event)
Club and Luxury seats: 2,460
Sky boxes: 66
Party Boxes: 4
Seats in bars, restaurants and cafés: 2,900 
Beers that can be tapped in one break: 30,000
Parking: 280 places
Population of its catchment area: 1.5 to 1.8 million people

See also
 List of European ice hockey arenas
 List of tennis stadiums by capacity
 The O2 Arena (London)

References

External links

Official website of the O2 arena

Sports venues completed in 2004
Indoor arenas in the Czech Republic
Indoor ice hockey venues in the Czech Republic
Basketball venues in the Czech Republic
Sports venues in Prague
Czech Republic
Music venues in Prague
Music venues completed in 2004
2004 establishments in the Czech Republic
21st-century architecture in the Czech Republic